Fiszman is a surname of Yiddish origin, being a variant of the surname Fischman. Notable people with the surname include:

Danny Fiszman (1945-2011), English diamond dealer
Jack Fishman (1930-2013), born Jacob Fiszman, Jewish-American pharmaceutical researcher
Jakub Fiszman (1956-1996), German abduction and murder victim
Jean-Louis Fiszman (1960-2021), French caricaturist, illustrator, and comic book author
Sergio Fiszman (born 1955), Argentine former wrestler

See also
Fishman (surname)